Whitefish River First Nation is an Ojibwe First Nation in Manitoulin District, Ontario. It is a member of the United Chiefs and Councils of Manitoulin. Its reserve is located at Whitefish River 4.

The reserve is one of the few subdivisions of Manitoulin District that is not on Manitoulin Island or its surrounding islands. This mainland peninsula also serves as a corridor for Ontario Highway 6 and the only bridge to Manitoulin Island.

Notable members 
 Deborah McGregor, environmentalist, educator

References

Ojibwe governments
First Nations governments in Ontario
Ojibwe reserves in Ontario